Laatre is a small borough in Valga County in southern Estonia, located about 16 km northeast of the town of Estonia. Between 1992 and 2017, until the 2017 administrative reform of Estonian local governments, Laatre was the administrative center of Tõlliste Parish. It is now part of Valga Parish. Laatre has a population of 238 (as of 2011) and an area of 2.024 km².

Laatre Manor (Välek, later Fölck) was first mentioned in 1555. The name "Laatre" is derived from one of the owners of the manor the Platers.

There are two churches in Laatre: the Lutheran St. Lawrence church (Laatre Püha Laurentsiuse kirik) and the Orthodox Laatre Church of the Holy Spirit (Laatre Pühavaimu kirik).

References 

Boroughs and small boroughs in Estonia
Valga Parish